is a passenger railway station in the city of Tatebayashi, Gunma, Japan, operated by the private railway operator Tōbu Railway.

Lines

Station layout
The station has two opposed side platforms, connected to the station building by a footbridge.

Platforms

Adjacent stations

History
Morinjimae Station opened on 1 April 1927.

From 17 March 2012, station numbering was introduced on all Tōbu lines, with Morinjimae Station becoming "TI-09".

Passenger statistics
In fiscal 2019, the station was used by an average of 1574 passengers daily (boarding passengers only).

Surrounding area
 Morinji Temple
 Morinji Numa (swamp)
 Yacho-no-mori flower garden

References

External links

  Tobu station information 
	

Tobu Isesaki Line
Stations of Tobu Railway
Railway stations in Gunma Prefecture
Railway stations in Japan opened in 1927
Tatebayashi, Gunma